Eric Herman may refer to:

 Eric Herman (American football) (born 1989), American football offensive guard
 Eric Herman (musician) (born 1969), American musician